Lim Seon-joo (born 27 November 1990) is a South Korean footballer who plays as a centre-back for the Incheon Hyundai Steel Red Angels and the South Korean national team. She represented South Korea at the 2015 FIFA Women's World Cup.

References

External links

National Team stats 

1990 births
Living people
South Korean women's footballers
South Korea women's under-20 international footballers
South Korea women's international footballers
Women's association football defenders
WK League players
Incheon Hyundai Steel Red Angels WFC players
Footballers at the 2014 Asian Games
2015 FIFA Women's World Cup players
Footballers at the 2018 Asian Games
2019 FIFA Women's World Cup players
Asian Games bronze medalists for South Korea
Asian Games medalists in football
Medalists at the 2014 Asian Games
Medalists at the 2018 Asian Games
Universiade gold medalists for South Korea
Universiade medalists in football
Medalists at the 2009 Summer Universiade
21st-century South Korean women